The Amateur Football Combination (AFC) is a football league based in and around London and the Home Counties, and is believed to be the biggest adult football league in Europe.

History
The Amateur Football Combination is one of the biggest adult football leagues in Europe, with around 75 clubs and 200 teams playing Saturday afternoons in and around London and the Home Counties from September through to May, and comprises more than 1% of adult male 11-a-side football teams in England.

The AFC is an adult male league affiliated to the Amateur Football Alliance (AFA), with clubs that also compete from London FA, Middlesex FA and Surrey FA, and was formed in 2002 by the merger of the Old Boys' Football League (1907) and Southern Olympian League (1911) and subsequently merging with the London Financial Football Association (itself comprising the London Banks Football Association, 1900 and the London Insurance Football Association, 1908) in 2006.

AFC Membership
Clubs and club members include "Old Boys" sides, local authorities and businesses, as well as socials.

League Structure
The league is divided into four sections using a pyramid system, but plays outside of the "football pyramid" - the top teams do not progress into semi-professional leagues:

Cup Competitions
As well as league competitions, AFC clubs take part in cup competitions. Most clubs enter the Amateur Football Alliance County Cups, but depending on their location clubs also enter Surrey FA, London FA and Middlesex FA Cups. Almost all clubs also enter the London Old Boys Cups. In the event of a dry winter, if the league programme finishes early in the spring, the AFC will run its own "Spring Cups".

Recent divisional champions, Senior Section

Spirit of Football
In 2006 the AFC launched its "Spirit of Football" campaign, emphasising and promoting fair play and respect for all within the game, a concept later embraced nationally within the Football Association's "Respect" campaign.

References

External links
 Amateur Football Alliance
 Amateur Football Combination
 Amateur Football Combination Facebook Page

 
Football leagues in England
Football competitions in London
Sports leagues established in 2002
2002 establishments in England
Amateur association football